Monika Baumgartl (born 1942) is a German photographer, performance artist and representative of .

Life and work 
Born in Prague, Protectorate of Bohemia and Moravia) Baumgartl trained as a photographer in Hofheim am Taunus from 1966 to 1968. She then moved to Düsseldorf, worked as an actress (among others a member of ) and was assistant to the German filmmaker and video galerist Gerry Schum. Since 1970, she has been active as a photographic artist. From 1970 to 1976, she organised performances and joint exhibitions together with Klaus Rinke.

Baumgartl had her first solo exhibition in 1974. Her photographs are almost exclusively night shots. She participated in Documenta 5 in Kassel in 1972 in the section n: Self-Representation - Performances - Activities - Changes and was also represented as an artist at Documenta 6 in 1977. Since the 1980s, she has worked as a trainer for tapdance and taiko.

References

Further reading 
 Exhibition catalogue: documenta 5. Befragung der Realität – Bildwelten heute; Catalogue (as Aktenordner) vol. 1: (Material); vol. 2: (Exponatliste); Kassel 1972
 documenta Archiv (ed.); Wiedervorlage d5 – Eine Befragung des Archivs zur documenta 1972; Kassel/Ostfildern 2001, 
 Katalog zur documenta 6: Vol. 1: Malerei, Plastik/Environment, Performance; Vol. 2: Fotografie, Film, Video; Vol. 3: Handzeichnungen, Utopisches Design, Bücher; Kassel 1977 
 Renate Buschmann, Stephan von Wiese (ed.): Fotos schreiben Kunstgeschichte, DuMont, Köln 2007 (Ausstellungskatalog zur Ausstellung Fotos schreiben Kunstgeschichte, 8 December 2007 until 2 March 2008, Museum Kunst Palast, Düsseldorf);

External links 
 Beispiele ihrer Werke
 
 Monika Baumgartl on Documenta Archiv
 

German performance artists
20th-century women photographers
21st-century women photographers
1942 births
Living people
Artists from Prague